Yihwa is a given name in various cultures.

In Chinese and Korean
In  Chinese and Korean, the meaning of the name varies depending on the Chinese characters used to write each syllable of the name. For example, the Chinese-derived Korean words for "pear blossoms" and "plum blossoms" are both pronounced "Yi-hwa" in Korean. There are a great variety of potential meanings, as there are 35 hanja with the reading "yi" and 15 hanja with the reading "hwa" on the South Korean government's official list of hanja which may be used in given names. In Chinese Pinyin, the name could also be spelled Yihua.

In Thailand
In Thai, Yihwa, also spelled Yiwha and Yiwah, is a feminine given name meaning "soul" or "heart". It is often a shortened form of the associated name Wanyiwa (also spelled Wanyihwa, etc.).

People 
 Eva Chen (Chen Yi-hwa; born 1959), Taiwanese businesswoman who founded security firm Trend Micro
 Yihua An (born 1970), Chinese doctor

Fictional characters 
 Yihwa, a character from the 2016 Thai television series Bad Romance and its prequel
 Yi-hwa, main character of the 1977 South Korean film Winter Woman
 Ahn Yi-hwa, character in the 1997 South Korean television drama Star in My Heart
 Shin Yi-hwa, character in the 2007 South Korean film Black House
 Yeon Yi-hwa, character from the South Korean webtoon Tower of God

References 

Thai feminine given names
Korean feminine given names